The AY-6 is a 6-speed manual transmission manufactured by Aisin. It is designed for longitudinal engine applications and can handle up to 345 ft·lbf (468 N·m) of torque.

General Motors used the AY-6 as RPO MV1, MV5, and MV7.

Gear ratios:

Applications:
 2004 Holden VZ Commodore
 2005 Holden VZ Ute
 2005 Cadillac CTS
 2004-2006 Toyota Tundra
 2004-2015 Toyota Tacoma
 2004- Toyota Land Cruiser Prado
 2006 Holden VE Commodore
 2005-2012 Lexus IS220d
 2005-2012 Lexus IS250
 2006-2017 Toyota FJ Cruiser
 2007 Holden VE Commodore
 2010 Chevrolet Camaro
 2010-2012 Lexus IS200d
 2010-2015 Chevrolet Camaro 1LT, 2LT, RS
 2015, 2019 Toyota Mark X GRMN

See also
 Toyota RA60
 List of Aisin transmissions
 [[Aisin-Warner AY6 Manual Transmission Details; 
2007 Model Year Summary
Aisin AY6 six-speed manual transmission

 No Changes For The 2007 Model Year

LOW MAINTENANCE

The MV1 uses conventional 75W90 gear oil, and no maintenance is required under normal operating conditions. Fluid changes are recommended for severe duty. A hydraulic clutch eliminates adjustments throughout the lifespan of the transmission.

OVERVIEW
The Aisin AY6 is a unique transmission design for Aisin, and the Cadillac CTS for the 2005 Model Year was one of its first applications. It features an uncommon “tailset” design. Compared to a conventional rear-drive manual transmission, the tailset design utilizes a long input shaft supported by a short output shaft, which is the converse of a traditional two-axis manual transmission design which uses a “headset” design. Because of the new path of the torque flow, the gearsets carry less torque and operate at a higher rpm compared to a conventional manual transmission. Therefore, the transmission can handle more torque than a similar-size headset design manual. The countershaft of the transmission remains a conventional design.

With the addition of the higher-output High-Feature V6 engine to the Cadillac CTS, a new six-speed manual transmission from Aisin replaced the previous Getrag 260 five-speed manual transmission. The Aisin AY6 will handle the increased torque from the 2.8-liter and 3.6-liter V6 engines, and features lower shift efforts for easier shifting, closer ratios for more rewarding high-performance driving, and quieter operation.

The closely spaced ratios were specified by GM Powertrain and are unique to the CTS application. The ratios allow even stepping between gears and are optimized to the power characteristics of the engines.

The AY6’s tailset design reduces the inertia required by the synchronizers to match gearset speeds during an upshift or a downshift. This reduces the demand on the synchronizers, which in turn reduces the amount of effort by the driver to shift gears. The tailset design also reduces the length of the output shaft, which is typically the source of noise in a conventional manual transmission when the powertrain is idling in neutral.

It features a synchronized reverse gear, and a case made of aluminum. All synchronizers use brass material for their friction surfaces, a softer, more common material that is allowed by the reduced demands on the synchronizers.

Clutch actuation is through a concentric release bearing, a common method of ensuring a linear actuation, which translates to a higher-quality pedal feel for the driver.

The shift rail inside the transmission is located near the top of the case, and attaches to the shifter through a small coupling, similar to the previous Getrag design. This design allows all shift efforts to be transmitted to the transmission rather than a portion derailed into the car’s body.

The Aisin AY6 is built in Anjo City, Japan.

Type: rear wheel drive, six-speed manual transmission
Engine range:.........................2.8L - 3.6L
Maximum engine torque:...........345 Nm (255 lb-ft)
Gear ratios:
First:....................................4.15
Second:................................2.33
Third:...................................1.53
Fourth:.................................1.15
Fifth:....................................1
Six:......................................0.79
Reverse:...............................-3.67
Final Drive Ratio:.....................3.42, 3.73
Case material:........................aluminum
Center distance:.....................85mm
Fluid type:.............................75W90
Transmission weight: wet:........57.2 kg (126 lb)
Fluid capacity (approximate):....1.8L (1.9 qt)
Power take off:.......................no
Applications:...........................Cadillac CTS]]

AY
General Motors transmissions